Claudio Sprecher (born 6 April 1980 in Chur) is a Liechtensteiner former alpine skier who competed in the 2006 Winter Olympics.

External links
 sports-reference.com

1980 births
Living people
Liechtenstein male alpine skiers
Olympic alpine skiers of Liechtenstein
Alpine skiers at the 2006 Winter Olympics
People from Chur
21st-century Liechtenstein people